Charles E. Boles (b. 1829; d. after February 28, 1888), also known as Black Bart, was an American outlaw noted for the poetic messages he left behind after two of his robberies. Often called Charley by his friends, he was also known as Charles (or C.E.) Bolton. Considered a gentleman bandit with a reputation for style and sophistication, he was one of the most notorious stagecoach robbers to operate in and around Northern California and southern Oregon during the 1870s and 1880s.

Early life
Charles Boles was born in Norfolk, England, to John and Maria Boles (sometimes spelled Bolles). He was the third of ten children, having six brothers and three sisters.

California Gold Rush
In late 1849, Boles and his brothers David and James joined in the California Gold Rush, prospecting in the North Fork of the American River near Sacramento. They traveled home in 1852, but Boles later returned with his brothers David and Robert. Both brothers fell ill shortly after their arrival and died. Charles Boles remained in California for another two years before giving up and returning East again.

In 1854, Boles (who now used this spelling) married Mary Elizabeth Johnson. By 1860, they were living with their four children in Decatur, Illinois.

Civil War
On August 13, 1862, Boles enlisted as a private in Company B, 116th Illinois Regiment (his name is spelled "Boles" in the company records). He was a good soldier and became a First sergeant within a year. Boles was seriously wounded at the Battle of Vicksburg, and took part in Sherman's March to the Sea. He received brevet commissions as both second lieutenant and first lieutenant, and on June 7, 1865, was discharged with his regiment in Washington, D.C. He returned home at last to his family in Illinois.

Prospecting again
In 1867, Boles went prospecting for gold in Idaho and Montana. In a surviving letter to his wife from August 1871, he told her of an unpleasant encounter with some Wells, Fargo & Company agents and vowed to exact revenge. His wife never heard from him again, and in time she presumed he had died.

Criminal career
Boles adopted the nickname "Black Bart" and proceeded to rob Wells Fargo stagecoaches at least 28 times across northern California between 1875 and 1883, including a number of times along the historic Siskiyou Trail between California and Oregon. He only left two poems – at the fourth and fifth robbery sites – but this came to be considered his signature and ensured his fame. Black Bart was quite successful, often taking in thousands of dollars a year.

Boles was afraid of horses and made all of his robberies on foot. With this, his poems and his unusually polite demeanor, he gained notoriety. He reportedly never once fired a weapon during his years as an outlaw.

Boles was invariably polite and used no foul language, despite its appearance in his poems. He dressed in a long linen duster coat and a bowler hat, using a flour sack with holes cut for his eyes as a mask. He brandished a shotgun, but never used it. These features became his trademarks.

First robbery
On July 26, 1875, Boles robbed his first stagecoach in Calaveras County, California, on the road between Copperopolis and Milton. He spoke with a deep and resonant tone as he politely ordered stage driver John Shine to "throw down the box". As Shine handed over the strongbox, Boles shouted, "If he dares to shoot, give him a solid volley, boys". Seeing rifle barrels pointed at him from the nearby bushes, Shine quickly handed over the strongbox. Shine waited until Boles vanished and then went to recover the empty strongbox, but upon examining the area, he discovered that the "men with rifles" were actually carefully rigged sticks. Black Bart's first robbery netted him $160.

Last stagecoach robbery
His last holdup took place on November 3, 1883, at the site of his first robbery on Funk Hill, southeast of the present town of Copperopolis. Boles wore a flour-sack mask with two eye holes. Driven by Reason McConnell, the stage had crossed the Reynolds Ferry on the old road from Sonora to Milton. The driver stopped at the ferry to pick up Jimmy Rolleri, the 19-year-old son of the ferry owner. Rolleri had his rifle with him and got off at the bottom of the hill to hunt along the creek and meet the stage on the other side. When he arrived at the western end, he found that the stage was not there and began walking up the stage road. Near the summit, he saw the stage driver and his team of horses.

McConnell told him that as the stage had approached the summit, Boles had stepped out from behind a rock with a shotgun in his hands. He forced McConnell to unhitch the team and take them over the crest of the hill. Boles then tried to remove the strongbox from the stage, but it had been bolted to the floor and took Boles some time to remove. Rolleri and McConnell went over the crest and saw Boles backing out of the stage with the strong box. McConnell grabbed Rolleri's rifle and fired at Boles twice but missed. Rolleri took the rifle and fired as Boles entered a thicket. He stumbled as if he had been hit. Running to the thicket, they found a small, blood-stained bundle of mail he had dropped.

Boles had been wounded in the hand. After running a quarter of a mile, he stopped and wrapped a handkerchief around his hand to control the bleeding. He found a rotten log and stuffed the sack with the gold amalgam into it, keeping $500 in gold coins. He hid the shotgun in a hollow tree, threw everything else away, and fled. In a manuscript written by stage driver McConnell about 20 years after the robbery, he claimed he fired all four shots at Boles. The first missed, but he thought the second or third shot hit Boles, and was sure the fourth did. Boles only had the one wound to his hand.

Investigation and arrest
When Boles was wounded and forced to flee, he left behind several personal items. These included his eyeglasses, some food, and a handkerchief with a laundry mark F.X.O.7. Wells Fargo Detective James B. Hume found these at the scene. Hume and detective Harry N. Morse contacted every laundry in San Francisco about the laundry mark. After visiting nearly 90 laundries, they traced it to Ferguson & Bigg's California Laundry on Bush Street and learned that the handkerchief belonged to a man who lived in a modest boarding house.

The detectives learned that Boles called himself a mining engineer and made frequent "business trips" that coincided with the Wells Fargo robberies. After initially denying he was Black Bart, Boles eventually admitted he had robbed several Wells Fargo stages, though he confessed only to crimes committed before 1879. Boles apparently believed the statute of limitations had expired on those robberies. When booked, he gave his name as T. Z. Spalding, but police found a Bible, a gift from his wife, inscribed with his real name.

The police report said that Boles was "a person of great endurance. Exhibited genuine wit under most trying circumstances, and was extremely proper and polite in behavior. Eschews profanity."

Conviction and imprisonment
Wells Fargo only pressed charges on the final robbery. Boles was convicted and sentenced to six years in San Quentin Prison, but he was released after four years for good behavior, in January 1888. His health had clearly deteriorated due to his time in prison; he had visibly aged, his eyesight was failing, and he had gone deaf in one ear. Reporters swarmed around him when he was released and asked if he was going to rob any more stagecoaches. "No, gentlemen," he replied, smiling, "I'm through with crime."

Final days
Boles never returned to his wife after his release from prison, though he did write to her. In one of the letters he said he was tired of being shadowed by Wells Fargo, felt demoralized, and wanted to get away from everybody. In February 1888, Boles left the Nevada House and vanished. Hume said Wells Fargo tracked him to the Visalia House hotel in Visalia. The hotel owner said a man answering the description of Boles had checked in and then disappeared. The last known sighting of Black Bart was on February 28, 1888.

Copycat robber
On November 14, 1888, another Wells Fargo stage was robbed by a masked highwayman. The lone bandit left a verse that read:

So here I've stood while wind and rain
Have set the trees a-sobbin,
And risked my life for that box,
That wasn't worth the robbin.

Detective Hume was called to examine the note. After comparing it with the handwriting of genuine Black Bart poetry, he declared the new holdup was the work of a copycat criminal.

Rumors and theories
Victoria Tudor, the Marysville Cemetery Commissioner has said Boles had lived in Marysville, California in late life, working as a pharmacist. It is believed his grave is located in the Marysville Cemetery in Marysville. Black Bart is also rumored to have been buried in an unmarked grave in the Knights Landing Cemetery in Knights Landing, California. Johnny Thacker, a Wells Fargo detective who had participated in Boles's arrest, said in 1897 that he knew Boles to have gone to live in Japan.

Verses
Boles, like many of his contemporaries, read dime novel–style serial adventure stories which appeared in local newspapers. In the early 1870s, the Sacramento Union ran a story called The Case of Summerfield by Caxton (a pseudonym of William Henry Rhodes). In the story, the villain dressed in black and had long unruly black hair, a large black beard, and wild grey eyes. The villain, named Black Bart, robbed Wells Fargo stagecoaches and brought great fear to those who were unlucky enough to cross him. Boles may have read the Sacramento Union story. He told a Wells Fargo detective that the name popped into his head when he was writing the first poem, and he used it.

Boles left only two authenticated verses. The first was at the scene of the August 3, 1877, holdup of a stage traveling from Point Arena to Duncans Mills, California:

The second verse was left at the site of his July 25, 1878, holdup of a stage traveling from Quincy to Oroville, California:

List of crimes

1870s
 July 26, 1875: The stage from Sonora, Tuolumne County to Milton, Calaveras County was robbed by a man wearing a flour sack over his head with two holes cut out for the eyes.
 December 28, 1875: The stage from North San Juan, Nevada County to Marysville, Yuba County. A newspaper related that it was held up by four men. This too had a description of the lone robber and his "trademarks". The "three other men" were in the hills around the stage; the driver saw their "rifles". When the investigators arrived at the scene they found the "rifles" used in the heist were nothing more than sticks wedged in the brush.
 August 3, 1877: The stage from Point Arena, Mendocino County to Duncans Mills, Sonoma County.
 July 25, 1878: A stage traveling from Quincy, Plumas County to Oroville, Butte County.
 October 2, 1878: In Mendocino County, near Ukiah, Bart was seen picnicking along the roadside before the robbery.
 October 3, 1878: In Mendocino County, the stage from Covelo to Ukiah was robbed. Bart walked to the McCreary farm and paid for dinner. Fourteen-year-old Donna McCreary provided the first detailed description of Bart: "Graying brown hair, missing two of his front teeth, deep-set piercing blue eyes under heavy eyebrows. Slender hands and intellectual in conversation, well-flavored with polite jokes."
 June 21, 1879: The stage from La Porte, Plumas County to Oroville, Butte County. Bart said to the driver, "Sure hope you have a lot of gold in that strongbox, I'm nearly out of money." In fact, the stage held no Wells Fargo gold or cash.
 October 25, 1879: An interstate route was robbed when Bart held up the stage from Roseburg, Douglas County, Oregon, to Redding, Shasta County, California, stealing U.S. mail pouches on a Saturday night.
 October 27, 1879: Another California robbery, the stage from Alturas, Modoc County, to Redding, Shasta County. Jim Hume was sure that Bart was the one-eyed ex-Ohioan, Frank Fox.

1880s
  July 22, 1880: In Sonoma County, the stage from Point Arena to Duncans Mills (same location as on August 3, 1877; Wells Fargo added it to the list when he was captured).
  September 1, 1880: In Shasta County, the stage from Weaverville to Redding. Near French Gulch, Bart said, "Hurry up the hounds; it gets lonesome in the mountains."
  September 16, 1880: In Jackson County, Oregon, the stage from Roseburg, Oregon to Yreka, California. This is the farthest north Bart is known to have robbed.
  September 23, 1880: In Jackson County, Oregon, the stage from Yreka to Roseburg (President Rutherford B. Hayes and General William T. Sherman traveled on this stage three days later). On October 1, a person (Frank Fox?) who closely matched the description of Bart was arrested at Elk Creek Station and later released.
  November 20, 1880: In Siskiyou County, the stage from Redding to Roseburg. This robbery failed because of the noise of an approaching stage or because of a hatchet in the driver's hand.
  August 31, 1881: In Siskiyou County, the stage from Roseburg to Yreka. Mail sacks were cut in a "T" shape, another Bart trademark.
  October 8, 1881: In Shasta County, the stage from Yreka to Redding. Stage driver Horace Williams asked Bart, "How much did you make?" Bart answered, "Not very much for the chances I take."
  October 11, 1881: In Shasta County, the stage from Lakeview to Redding. Hume kept losing Bart's trail.
  December 15, 1881: In Yuba County, near Marysville. Bart took mail bags and evaded capture due to his swiftness afoot.
  December 27, 1881: In Nevada County, the stage from North San Juan to Smartsville. Nothing much was taken, but Bart was wrongly blamed for another stage robbery in Smartsville.
  January 26, 1882: In Mendocino County, the stage from Ukiah to Cloverdale. Again the posse was on his tracks within the hour and again they lost him after Kelseyville.
  June 14, 1882:  In Mendocino County, the stage from Little Lake to Ukiah. Hiram Willits, Postmaster of Willitsville (present-day Willits, California), was on the stage.
  July 13, 1882: In Plumas County, the stage from La Porte to Oroville. This stage was loaded with gold and George Hackett was armed. Bart lost his derby as he fled the scene when it was determined that the Wells Fargo agent in LaPorte had supplied hardware to bolt down the strongbox. His derby was traced to him eventually through the laundry mark. The same stage was again held-up in Forbestown and Hackett blasted the would-be robber into the bushes. This was mistakenly blamed on Bart.
  September 17, 1882: In Shasta County, the stage from Yreka to Redding; a repeat of October 8, 1881 (same stage, place and driver), but Bart got only a few dollars.
  November 24, 1882: In Sonoma County, the stage from Lakeport to Cloverdale; "The longest 30 miles in the World."
  April 12, 1883: In Sonoma County, the stage from Lakeport to Cloverdale; another repeat of the last robbery.
  June 23, 1883: In Amador County, the stage from Jackson to Ione.
  November 3, 1883: In Calaveras County, the stage from Sonora to Milton.

Legacy

In geography
In some areas where Black Bart operated, notably Redwood Valley, California, there is a traditional annual Black Bart Parade featuring a man dressed as Black Bart playing him as a stereotypical Old West villain. Also in Redwood Valley, California, the road leading from California State Route 20 to Hell's Delight Canyon is called Black Bart Trail. There is a large rock at the side of Highway 101 on the Ridgewood Summit between Redwood Valley and Willits known by locals as "Black Bart Rock", though it is not the actual rock behind which Black Bart was reputed to have hidden while robbing stagecoaches (that rock having been lost in a series of highway improvements over the years). In Duncans Mills, California, there is a plaque commemorating Black Bart and featuring his first poem. In Oroville, there is a road named Black Bart Road, as well as a stone mortar monument with a description of a robbery that took place at the scene. In South Lake Tahoe, California there is a Black Bart Avenue off of Pioneer Trail commemorating his poems. In San Andreas, CA, there is an inn named for him: the Black Bart Inn.

In literature
Black Bart's life and exploits and his pursuit and capture by Hume and Morse are the subject of the 2017 novel The Ballad of Black Bart by Loren D. Estleman. The book was named Best Fiction in its "True West Best of the West 2018 Western Books" by True West Magazine.

In film and television
Dan Duryea starred as Black Bart in a 1948 film produced by Universal Studios, Black Bart.

In 1954, Arthur Space played Black Bart in the eponymous episode of Jim Davis's syndicated western television series, Stories of the Century.

In music
He inspired the Blue Lotus album Across The Canyon.

See also 
 List of people who disappeared

References

Bibliography

External links

 From Full Books "The Case of Summerfield" by William Henry Rhodes
 From Project Gutenberg "The Case of Summerfield" by William Henry Rhodes
 Black Bart: California's Infamous Stage Robber
 OdieWare Homepage: Black Bart
 

1829 births
1875 crimes in the United States
1880s missing person cases
1888 deaths
19th-century American criminals
19th-century English criminals
British emigrants to the United States
Criminals from California
Fugitives
Gunslingers of the American Old West
History of Butte County, California
Missing person cases in California
Outlaws of the American Old West
People from Jefferson County, New York
People from Norfolk
People of Illinois in the American Civil War
Union Army soldiers